Seelow (Mark) station is a railway station in the municipality of Seelow (Mark), located in the Märkisch-Oderland district in Brandenburg, Germany.

References

Railway stations in Brandenburg
Buildings and structures in Märkisch-Oderland